Pfitzner may refer to:

People

 Hans Pfitzner (1869–1949), German composer
 Josef Pfitzner (1901–1945), Nazi politician, historian, and Standartenführer in the SA who was executed for war crimes

Other uses
 Pfitzner Flyer (aeroplane), a 1909 monoplane
 Pfitzner-Moffatt oxidation, a chemical reaction
 G. Richard Pfitzner Stadium, located in Prince William County, Virginia, USA

See also

 Pfizer (disambiguation)
 Pfitz (disambiguation)
 Pfitzer (surname)
 Fitzner (surname)